The 1997–98 Scottish Cup was the 113th staging of Scotland's most prestigious football knockout competition. The Cup was won by Heart of Midlothian who defeated Rangers in the final.

First round

Replay

Second round

Replays

Third round

Replays

Fourth round

Replays

Quarter-finals

Replay

Semi-finals

Final

References

Scottish Cup seasons
Scottish Cup, 1997-98
Scot